Arthur Carrington is an American former professional tennis player.

Born and raised in Elizabeth, New Jersey, Carrington attended Hampton College on an athletic scholarship.

Carrington competed in the American Tennis Association (ATA), which was a version of the USTA for African-American players. He finished runner-up in 1972 and his final loss to Horace Reid was the first to be televised, on Boston's WGBH-TV. The following year he won the title.

In 1980 he established the Carrington Tennis Academy at Hampshire College.

References

External links
 

Year of birth missing (living people)
Living people
American male tennis players
Hampton Pirates tennis players
Tennis people from New Jersey
Sportspeople from Elizabeth, New Jersey
African-American male tennis players